Donald Sydney Smith OBE (27 July 19201 December 1998) was an Australian operatic tenor. His voice had a bright Italianate quality which could match, in size carrying power and tonal allure, the voices of most sopranos and mezzos.  He attracted a fiercely loyal public following, and many Australians who had no prior experience of opera became opera lovers through Smith's work.  His performances were regularly sold out with The Australian Opera at the Sydney Opera House.

Early years and background
Donald Sydney Smith was born in Bundaberg, Queensland, on 27 July 1920. Smith's early schooling and education was spasmodic and at around 10 years old, while in 4th grade primary school, he was removed from school by his parents (Donald Sydney Smith and Elizabeth Maud Smith - née Clarque), to help work on his family's milk run and dairy property.

At around the age of 12 years old he was sentenced to the notorious Westbrook Farm Home for boys (outside Toowoomba), where he spent some seven months for allegedly stealing and 'joy riding' in a friend's sister's boyfriend's motor vehicle with some of his mates. It is understood that Donald was the only youth in the group who was able to drive a motor vehicle, which he learned to do helping his father deliver milk on the family milk run.  (Today such a misdemeanour by a child of 12 years old would barely warrant a slap on the wrist). Donald was subsequently released into the care of relatives of his mother a Mr Leslie Robertson in Toowoomba and he then went to live with them in Brisbane. The circumstances of Donald's 'trial' and 'sentence' have never been detailed. Also it still remains a mystery as to why his father Donald Senior and his mother Maud would have allowed such a sentence to be carried out (with appeal) for such a small misdemeanour.

During the period after Donald's release from Westbrook, in his early teenage years, Donald continued to educate himself whilst working as a sugar cane cutter on properties in and around the Bundaberg area. At the age of 16 years Donald gained his first employment with the Bundaberg Millaquin Sugar Mill and started training in the capacity as a sugar chemist. At the age of 18 years old, Donald met Ms Thelma Joyce Lovett, who eventually became his lifelong partner and whom he married in Bundaberg in 1942. They remained together until Donald's passing in the Pleasantville Nursing Home in Wynnum Brisbane.  In 1942 their son Donald Robin Smith was born in Bundaberg, and Donald's two daughters Deanna Joy and Carol Beth were born in Brisbane in 1943 and 1945 respectively.

On 4 October 1941, during World War II, Donald Sydney Smith enlisted in the Australian Army (47th Battalion AFI Military Services Number QX48665). Donald served at Milne Bay in New Guinea. It was here in New Guinea whilst serving as a private and a machine gunner that he was wounded in the right hand by 'friendly fire’ after being mistaken for the enemy, whilst setting up range markers for the machine guns. Following being wounded, he was first transported to an American-based hospital ship believed to be the 'SS Tasman', for treatment of his injuries, and where he also contracted malaria and lost so much weight down to 6 stones. The Australian Army at that time were unaware of where he was being treated. Therefore it was during this time that Joy (who was on her way to hospital to deliver their first daughter Deanna Joy), was advised by the Army that Donald was still alive, as they had previously reported that he was "missing in action, believed to be deceased". During recuperation for his injuries and after being repatriated to Australia Donald was eventually discharged from the Army on 28 October 1943.

Singing career

Donald Smith began his singing career on the local radio station 4BU Bundaberg, firstly singing mainly 'country and western’ music. He also toured the local area with a group called ‘Novac's Troupers'. Although a natural tenor voice from birth, it is understood that Donald had his first ‘singing lesson’ in Bundaberg with a lady named Kate Gratehead. It was she who helped him refine his musical ability and vocal technique for his natural tenor voice. Following Donald's return to civilian life after being discharged from the Army, he and Joy firstly relocated from Bundaberg to Toowoomba and then eventually to Brisbane. In Brisbane Donald found work as a clerk with the Government's ‘Repatriation Department’. He also found additional work to support his young family, including that as a ‘lift driver’ in a David Jones department store.

On relocating to Brisbane, Donald also became acquainted with the well known band leader J.J. Kelly. Under Kelly's direction, he performed the tenor roles in some of his first operas. These included the lead tenor role of 'Sir Walter Raleigh' in Edward German's opera “Merry England” in Brisbane in 1944 -‘The English Rose’. He also performed the lead tenor role of ‘Thaddeus’ in Michael William Balfe's opera “The Bohemian Girl” - ‘When Other Lips - Then  You'll Remember Me’ and the role of 'Don Caesar de Bazen' in William Vincent Wallace's opera “Maritana” - ‘Yes Let Me Like A Soldier Fall’.

In 1948, Donald joined the Brisbane Opera Society, and sang many leading tenor roles with them, such as 'Don José' in Georges Bizet's “Carmen”, the title role in Charles Gounod's “Faust”, the 'Duke of Mantua’ in Giuseppe Verdi's “Rigoletto”, ‘Roméo’ in Charles Gounod's opera “Roméo and Juliette" and ‘Turiddu’ in Pietro Mascagni's “Cavalleria Rusticana” and ‘Canio’ in Ruggero Leoncavallo's opera “Pagliacci”. The role of Canio in particular was a role which Donald would eventually 'make his own' and for which he would become famous for his portrayal of the jilted lover Canio.

In 1952 after winning the 'Mobil Quest' singing competition in Australia, Donald travelled to Italy and then to England to study at London's National School of Opera. Following his return to Australia, Donald performed with an Italian touring company in 1955. Here he sang alongside singers such as Gabriella Tucci and Kenneth Neate.  In 1958 he appeared with the then Elizabethan Trust Opera Company. (which eventually became ‘The Australian Opera Company’ and now ‘Opera Australia’). He sang the roles of 'Count Almaviva’ in Gioachino Rossini's opera “The Barber of Seville" and ‘Tamino’ in Wolfgang Amadeus Mozart's opera “The Magic Flute”. In 1960 he sang his first ‘Pinkerton’ in Giacomo Puccini's opera “Madama Butterfly” opposite the Australian soprano Dame Joan Hammond.

In 1962 Donald again travelled to England to join the Sadlers Wells Opera Company. Here he performed many Verdi and Puccini operas including “Rigoletto”, “Attila”, “Ernani”, “A Masked Ball”, "Girl of the Golden West”, “Tosca” and “Il Trittico". He also made his debut at the Royal Opera House, Covent Garden, where he sang the role of ‘Calaf in Giocomo Puccini's opera “Turandot" opposite the English soprano Amy Shuard. Donald remained in  the UK for six years and returned to Australia in 1967 to sing with The Australian Opera, where he appeared is such roles as ‘Canio’ in “Pagliacci’, ‘Manrico’ in “Il Trovatore”, 'Bob Boles’ in Benjamin Britten's opera “Peter Grimes”, the 'Duke of Mantua’ in “Rigoletto”, 'Dick Johnson’ in "La fanciulla del West”, ‘Cavaradossi’ in “Tosca”, Radames in “Aida” and the 'King Gustavus’ in “Un Ballo In Maschera”. He also appeared in German roles, such as Florestan in Fidelio.

In 1968, the first opera telecast in Australia, Tosca, featured Marie Collier in the title role, Donald Smith as Cavaradossi, and Tito Gobbi as Scarpia.[5]

On 21 January 1973 Donald was the first voice to sing in the Sydney Opera House when he appeared in the first test concert in the Opera Theatre, along with Elizabeth Fretwell and members of the ABC National Training Orchestra, conducted by Robert Miller.

While Italian opera (and particularly where sung in English) was his natural metier, Donald also performed many concerts and song recitals. Together with his son Robin Donald Smith, who performed professionally under the name Robin Donald they presented in 1974 a series of 'Smith & Son' concerts throughout Australia.

Donald Smith's last performance for the Australian Opera was in Verdi's I Masnadieri, where he sang for the first time in an opera performance with Dame Joan Sutherland. These occasions were the only times that these two singers sang a complete opera together. Donald became ill and retired in 1981. He later became a singing teacher in Brisbane at the Queensland Conservatorium of Music.

Donald released many individual recordings both in England with the Sadler's Wells Opera Company and in Australia with EMI records. He also appears in compilation videos and CDs such as Celebration – 40 Years of Opera, and Australian Singers of Renown in Opera, Operetta & Song, compiled by John Cargher.

Donald Smith passed away on 1 December 1998 in the Pleasantville Nursing Home in Wynnum Brisbane, ending what had been an illustrious operatic career. He was survived by his wife Thelma Joyce (who passed away on 26 November 2009) and their three children.

Military career
Smith enlisted in the WWll war effort on 20 December 1941, and was discharged from the 47th Australian Infantry Battalion (Service Number QX48655), of the Citizens Military Forces on 28 October 1943. During this period, he served in the Citizens Military Forces and the Australian Imperial Force, on continuous full-time war service, both in Australia and at Milne Bay, New Guinea. It was in New Guinea whilst serving as private and a machine gunner, that Donald was wounded in the right hand by friendly fire, after being mistaken for the enemy, whilst setting up range markers for the machine guns. He was first transported to an American-based hospital ship for treatment of his injuries. The Australian Army at that time were unaware of where he had been taken. Therefore, it was during this time that his wife Joy (who was on her way to hospital to deliver their first daughter Deanna), was advised by the Army that he was reported "missing in action, believed to be deceased". During recuperation for his injuries and after being repatriated to Australia, Joy was then advised that Smith was still alive.

Operatic career
Smith began his career singing on the local radio station 4BU Bundaberg, singing mainly country and western songs. His first singing teacher in Bundaberg was a lady named Kate Gratehead. It was she who helped him refine his musical ability and vocal technique for his natural tenor voice. After the birth of their third child, Smith and his wife Joy left Bundaberg and relocated firstly to Toowoomba and later to Brisbane. Here Smith became acquainted with the well known band leader J.J. Kelly. Under Kelly's direction, and also working with the conductor George English, he performed some of the tenor roles in his first forays into grand opera. This included the lead tenor role of Sir Walter Raleigh, in Sir Edward German's Merrie England in Brisbane in 1944. He also performed the lead tenor role of Thaddeus in Michael William Balfe's The Bohemian Girl and the role of Don Caesar de Brazen in William Vincent Wallace's opera Maritana.

In 1948, Smith joined the Brisbane Opera Society, and sang roles such as Don José (Carmen), the title role in Faust, the Duke of Mantua (Rigoletto), Roméo (Roméo et Juliette) and Canio (Pagliacci).  Canio was a role for which Donald Smith became renowned throughout his long career. In 1952 he began two years of study at London's National School of Opera, after winning the Mobil Quest singing competition in Australia.  After a brief period overseas in Italy and England, he returned to Australia, and sang with an Italian touring company in 1955, alongside singers such as Gabriella Tucci and Ken Neate. In 1958 he appeared with the then Elizabeth Trust Opera Company, singing Count Almaviva (The Barber of Seville). In 1960 he sang the role of Pinkerton for the first time opposite Dame Joan Hammond's Madama Butterfly, performing in Brisbane at Her Majesty's Theatre.

He made his Sadler's Wells debut in England in 1962, where he performed many Verdi operas including Attila, Rigoletto and Un ballo in maschera. He also performed at the Royal Opera House, Covent Garden, where he made his debut as Calaf in Puccini's Turandot opposite the English soprano Amy Shuard.  He established his career in the UK for six years, before returning to Australia in 1967 to sing with the Australian Opera in major roles including Canio, Manrico (Il trovatore), Bob Boles (Peter Grimes), the Duke of Mantua (Rigoletto), Dick Johnson (The Girl of the Golden West), Cavaradossi (Tosca), Radames (Aida), and King Gustavus (Un ballo in maschera). He also sang the Germanic operatic repertoire, including Florestan in Fidelio and Eric in The Flying Dutchman.

During the 1970s, Smith and his son Robin Donald, also a tenor, made operatic history together, alternating singing the role of Eric in The Flying Dutchman, in performance with the Australian Opera Company (now Opera Australia). Robin also sang the role of The Steersman in performances on other occasions, when Donald was singing the role of Eric. These are the only known performances of any father and son tenors ever singing these roles together in this opera.

In 1968, the first opera telecast in Australia, Tosca, featured Marie Collier in the title role, Smith as Cavaradossi, and Tito Gobbi as Scarpia.

On 21 January 1973 Smith was the first voice to sing in the Sydney Opera House, when he appeared in the first test concert in the Opera Theatre, along with Elizabeth Fretwell and members of the ABC National Training Orchestra, conducted by Robert Miller.

While Italian opera (and particularly where sung in English) was his natural metier, he also performed many concerts and song recitals. Together with his son Robin Donald, they presented in 1974 a series of "Smith & Son" concerts throughout Australia singing in Brisbane, Sydney, Melbourne and Adelaide.

Smith's last performance for the Australian Opera was in Verdi's I masnadieri in 1980 with Joan Sutherland. While Smith and Sutherland did perform together in a number of concerts at the Sydney Opera House, I masnadieri was the only occasion when these two Australian icons performed a complete staged opera together. His health began to fail and in 1981 he retired from the professional operatic stage.  He later became a singing teacher in Brisbane at the Queensland Conservatorium of Music.

Legacy
Smith made many individual recordings both in England with the Sadler's Wells Opera Company and in Australia with EMI records and other recording companies. He also appears in compilation videos and CD's such as Celebration – 40 Years of Opera, and Australian Singers of Renown in Opera, Operetta & Song, compiled by John Cargher.

Smith died in the Pleasantville Nursing Home in Brisbane on 1 December 1998.

His eldest grandson, Jason Cundy, was an English Premier League player for Chelsea, Tottenham Hotspur and Ipswich, and played for England U21.

Honours
In 1973 Donald Smith was appointed an Officer of the Order of the British Empire. He was the first resident member of the Australian Opera to be awarded this honour.

Discography

Albums

References

Sources
 Sydney Morning Herald, obituary, 5 December 1998
 

1920 births
1998 deaths
Australian operatic tenors
People from Bundaberg
Musicians from Queensland
Australian military personnel of World War II
Academic staff of Queensland Conservatorium Griffith University
Australian Officers of the Order of the British Empire
20th-century Australian male opera singers